The 11th Canadian Folk Music Awards were presented in Edmonton, Alberta on November 8, 2015.

Nominees and recipients
Recipients are listed first and highlighted in boldface.

References

External links
Canadian Folk Music Awards

11
Canadian Folk Music Awards
Canadian Folk Music Awards
Canadian Folk Music Awards
Canadian Folk Music Awards